60 Hours to Glory was Pakistan's first ever military reality show which featured 12 teams participating in 60 hour long 4th International Pakistan Army Team Spirit Competition. The show was produced by ISPR and telecasted by PTV Home and Hum TV.

Participants
12 teams participated in 4th International Pakistan Army Team Spirit Competition, with each team having eight members.

Local teams 
 Rawalpindi Pasbans
 Lahore Taiz-o-tund
 Gujranwala Sarfarosh
 Quetta Hingorians
 Bahawalpur Thunders
 Mangla Zilzaal
 Karachi Zinda Dil
 Multan Charging Bulls

Foreign teams 
 Team Turkey
 Team Uzbekistan
 Team Sri Lanka
 Team Jordan

See also 
 Inter-Services Public Relations media productions

References

External links 
 
 

Inter-Services Public Relations media productions
Pakistani reality television series